Gregorio Sauceda Gamboa is a Mexican illegal drug trafficker of the Los Zetas, when Los Zetas were the armed wing of the Gulf Cartel.

Sauceda was a former investigative police officer,  who helped smuggle an average of 10 tons of cocaine and 30 tons of marijuana across the border each month.

Arrest
He was captured on April 30, 2009 in Matamoros, Tamaulipas along with his wife and his bodyguard, Miguel Ángel Reyes Grajales. Mexican Authorities had offered a 30 million pesos (about US$2.1 million) bounty for information leading to his capture.

Kingpin Act sanction
On 24 March 2010, the United States Department of the Treasury sanctioned Sauceda-Gamboa under the Foreign Narcotics Kingpin Designation Act (sometimes referred to simply as the "Kingpin Act"), for his involvement in drug trafficking along with fifty-three other international criminals and ten foreign entities. The act prohibited U.S. citizens and companies from doing any king of business activity with him, and virtually froze all his assets in the U.S.

See also
 List of Mexico's 37 most-wanted drug lords
 Gulf Cartel
 Los Zetas

References

Gulf Cartel members
Los Zetas
Mexican crime bosses
Living people
People from Tamaulipas
People sanctioned under the Foreign Narcotics Kingpin Designation Act
Year of birth missing (living people)
People involved in the 1999 Matamoros standoff
Founding members of Los Zetas